The men's marathon was a track and field athletics event held as part of the athletics at the 1912 Summer Olympics programme. The distance used was 40.2 kilometres, nearly 2 full kilometres shorter than that used in 1908 and since 1924. The competition was held on Sunday, July 14, 1912. 95 runners entered, but only 68 runners (from 19 nations) competed. NOCs could enter up to 12 athletes. With conditions described as "very hot", only 36 of the 68 competitors finished. The event was won by Ken McArthur of South Africa, the nation's first Olympic marathon victory. 

This event also saw the first Olympic fatality, as Francisco Lázaro collapsed during the race, and died in hospital the next morning, while another runner, Shizo Kanakuri, went missing: Kanakuri had dropped out of the race and returned home to Japan without notifying race officials.

Background

This was the fifth appearance of the event, which is one of 12 athletics events to have been held at every Summer Olympics. The field was strong. Sweden and the United States each entered full 12-man teams; the American team included 1911 Boston Marathon winner Clarence DeMar, 1912 Boston winner Michael J. Ryan, and 1908 Olympic bronze medalist Joseph Forshaw. Great Britain had 1909 Polytechnic winner Henry Barrett and 6 of the 8 finishers in the 1912 Polytechnic. Canada sent the winner of that 1912 Polytechnic, James Corkery. South Africa had the runner-up, Christian Gitsham, as well as Ken McArthur, who had won three marathons in South Africa.

Japan, Norway, Portugal, and Serbia each made their first appearance in Olympic marathons. The United States made its fifth appearance, the only nation to have competed in each Olympic marathon to that point.

Competition format

As all marathons, the competition was a single race. The course for the race was 40.2 kilometres long, which was more akin to the 1896 (40 km), 1900 (40.26 km), and 1904 (40 km) courses than the previous 1908 course (42.195 km) which would become standard.

It was "the first time the Olympic marathon was conducted as an out-and-back race." The course started at the stadium, went to the town of Sollentuna, and came back.

Records

These were the standing world and Olympic records (in hours) prior to the 1912 Summer Olympics.

The distance was nearly two kilometres shorter; nevertheless, Ken McArthur's winning time is registered as an Olympic record.

Schedule

Results

References
Specific

General
 
 

Athletics at the 1912 Summer Olympics
Marathons at the Olympics
Men's marathons